Serotonin antagonist and reuptake inhibitors (SARIs) are a class of drugs used mainly as antidepressants, but also as anxiolytics and hypnotics. They act by antagonizing serotonin receptors such as 5-HT2A and inhibiting the reuptake of serotonin, norepinephrine, and/or dopamine. Additionally, most also antagonize α1-adrenergic receptors. The majority of the currently marketed SARIs belong to the phenylpiperazine class of compounds.

List of SARIs

Marketed
 Etoperidone (Axiomin, Etonin)
 Lorpiprazole (Normarex)
 Mepiprazole (Psigodal)
 Nefazodone (Serzone, Nefadar)
 Trazodone (Desyrel)

Miscellaneous
 Vilazodone (Viibryd) – a related drug but does not fit into this class as it does not function as a serotonin antagonist, acting solely as a 5-HT1A receptor partial agonist instead.
 Vortioxetine (Trintellix) – another closely related drug, could technically be considered to be a member of this group, but both vilazodone and vortioxetine are instead generally labeled as serotonin modulators and stimulators.
 Niaprazine (Nopron) – a drug related to this group but does not inhibit the reuptake of serotonin or the other monoamines.
 Medifoxamine (Clédial, Gerdaxyl) – could perhaps technically be said to belong to this group, as it is a serotonin–dopamine reuptake inhibitor and 5-HT2A and 5-HT2C receptor antagonist, but not grouped as such.

Never marketed
 Lubazodone (YM-992, YM-35995) – a SARI that was never marketed.

Pharmacology

Binding profiles
The binding profiles of SARIs and some metabolites in terms of their affinities for various receptors and transporters are as follows:

These drugs act as antagonists or inverse agonists of the 5-HT2A, α1-adrenergic, and H1 receptors, as partial agonists of the 5-HT1A receptor, and as inhibitors of the transporters. mCPP is an antagonist of the 5-HT2B receptor, an agonist of the 5-HT1A, 5-HT2C, and 5-HT3 receptors, and acts as a partial agonist of the human 5-HT2A and 5-HT2C receptors.

See also
 Serotonin modulator and stimulator (SMS)
 Noradrenergic and specific serotonergic antidepressant (NaSSA)
 Norepinephrine-dopamine disinhibitor (NDDI)
 Selective serotonin reuptake inhibitor (SSRI)

References

Antidepressants
Anxiolytics
Serotonin receptor antagonists
Serotonin reuptake inhibitors